This is a non-exhaustive list of recreational vehicle manufacturers.

References